Roughly Speaking is the sixteenth studio album by the Canadian rock band April Wine, released in November 2006.

The album was recorded without computerized modern digital recording techniques. Instead, the group employed the same type of audiophile quality analog recording technology it had used during the 1980s, including a 2-inch, 24 track master tape recorder and a state-of-the art half-inch 2-track stereo recorder. Members of the band, along with some other music fans, believe that such equipment can provide a more musically pleasing, or "vintage" type of sound.

The songs are all new material written by original frontman Myles Goodwyn, with the exception of one track, "Night Life", written by Willie Nelson.

Track listing
 "Saw Someone (That Wasn't There)" – 3:59
 "I've Had Enough for Now (I Wanna Go Home)" – 2:46
 "Night Life" (Willie Nelson, Walter Breeland, Paul Buskirk, Myles Goodwyn) – 3:18
 "Sheila" – 3:35
 "You Don't Even Know (How I Love You So)" – 3:01
 "I Am, I Am" – 3:23
 "Life Goes On" – 3:26
 "If You're Comin' (I'm Outta Here)" – 1:20

Personnel
 Myles Goodwyn – vocals, guitar, organ
 Brian Greenway – guitars, background vocals, harmonica
 Jim Clench – bass, background vocals
 Jerry Mercer – drums, background vocals

References

April Wine albums
2006 albums
Universal Records albums
Albums produced by Myles Goodwyn